Norman Somerville Macfarlane, Baron Macfarlane of Bearsden,  (5 March 1926 – 5 November 2021) was a Scottish industrialist and member of the House of Lords who sat as a Conservative.

Biography
Educated at the High School of Glasgow and later a Royal Artillery Officer in the British military personnel of the Palestine Emergency, Macfarlane was a Member of the Council of the Confederation of British Industry (Scotland) from 1975 to 1981, a Board Member of the Scottish Development Agency from 1979 to 1987, and a Member of the Royal Fine Art Commission for Scotland from 1980 to 1982. Macfarlane received a knighthood on 9 February 1983, was a Deputy Lieutenant and was created a life peer with the title Baron Macfarlane of Bearsden, in the District of Bearsden and Milngavie, for the Conservative Party, on 29 July 1991 and made a Knight of the Most Ancient and Most Noble Order of the Thistle on 3 December 1996. He retired from the House of Lords on 21 July 2016. 

Macfarlane was Lord High Commissioner to the General Assembly of the Church of Scotland in 1992, 1993 and 1997. He had been a member of Glasgow Art Club since 1969. In 1991, he was elected a Fellow of the Royal Society of Edinburgh. Macfarlane was Honorary Patron of Queen's Park Football Club.

Death
Macfarlane died on 5 November 2021, at the age of 95.

Arms

References

Macfarlane, Normane
Macfarlane, Normane
British military personnel of the Palestine Emergency
Macfarlane of Bearsden
Knights Bachelor
Knights of the Thistle
Lords High Commissioner to the General Assembly of the Church of Scotland
People educated at the High School of Glasgow
Royal Artillery officers
Fellows of the Royal Society of Edinburgh
Life peers created by Elizabeth II